The VL Humu (Whirlwind) is a Finnish fighter aircraft, designed by Valtion lentokonetehdas in 1944, and based on the American Brewster F2A Buffalo.

Design and development
The Finnish Air Force had acquired 40+ surplus B-239 naval variants of the Brewster Buffalo and put them to good use during the Winter War, so it was decided in 1942 to produce a copy due to aircraft shortages. Chief designer Martti Vainio, along with designers Torsti Verkkola, Arvo Ylinen at Valtion Lentokonetehdas were tasked with designing the new aircraft as well as a replacement wing made of wood instead of metal.

The Humu was largely constructed out of wood due to scarcity of metals, but the frame was made from steel and its design followed closely that of the Brewster. It was planned that captured Soviet engines and instrument panels would be used. It was powered by a 930hp Shvetsov M-63 engine, previously tested on a Brewster. The wooden wing added 250 kg of extra weight and moving the fuels tanks from the wing to the aft fuselage adversely affected maneuverability due to the center of gravity being shifted.

The first flight took place on 8 August 1944. Later flight testing gave a total flight time of 19 hours and 50 minutes. The aircraft was  heavier than calculated, its engine was underpowered, and it was felt that the fighter would not be able to compete against enemy aircraft. The end of the Continuation War in September 1944, combined with the aircraft's poor performance, however, put the end to the project.

Operators

 Finnish Air Force

Aircraft on display
The sole Humu, HM-671, was placed in storage in 1945. It was restored between 1972 and 1974 and is displayed at the Central Finland Aviation museum.

Specifications (VL Humu)

See also

References

Further reading

External links

The VL Humu at Central Finland Aviation museum

Humu
1940s Finnish fighter aircraft
Single-engined tractor aircraft
Low-wing aircraft
Aircraft first flown in 1944
World War II aircraft of Finland